Shahrbani, formerly called Nazmiyeh, was a law enforcement force in Iran with police duties inside cities. Founded during Qajar dynasty, it was eventually merged with the rural and roads police Gendarmerie and Islamic Revolution Committees in 1991 to form Law Enforcement Force of Islamic Republic of Iran (NAJA).

References 

 
Government agencies established in 1913
Government agencies disestablished in 1991
Law enforcement in Iran
1913 establishments in Iran
1991 disestablishments in Iran
Defunct law enforcement agencies